Alan Blayney (born 9 October 1981) is a professional footballer who played as a goalkeeper. He was recognised at the IFA Premiership and Irish Cup several times. He is now the first team goalkeeper coach at NIFL Premiership side Larne.

Club career

England
Born from Belfast, Northern Ireland, Blayney started his career with Premiership side Southampton and was loaned out to Stockport County, but was cut short by a broken finger. He also he had a spell at AFC Bournemouth on loan. He made his début for Southampton in May 2004, receiving a high amount of praise. Blayney also won Sky Sports save of the season after saving an Alan Shearer header in May 2004 on his Premier League debut. The match at St Mary's ended in a 3–3 draw. Blayney also played in the following 2–1 defeat at Charlton. Blayney would play two more games for Southampton the following season, the 2–2 Premier League draw against West Bromwich Albion and the 5–2 League Cup loss against Watford. Blayney, who was then behind Antti Niemi and Paul Smith in the team's pecking order went on loan to Rushden & Diamonds and Brighton & Hove Albion. Brighton tried to sign Blayney on a permanent basis in 2005, but could not afford the transfer fee Southampton were asking. Blayney did return to Brighton & Hove Albion for a second loan spell, before returning to Southampton in mid-December.

Blayney then joined Doncaster Rovers for £50,000 from Southampton in January 2006, signing a two and half-year contract, with hopes of getting the team promoted to the Championship. Blayney started off as first choice goalkeeper at Belle Vue stadium, but fell behind Ben Smith and Dane Jan Budtz in the pecking order after an ankle injury. He decided to leave the club for personal reasons.

In February 2007, Blayney joined League One side Oldham Athletic, until the end of the 2006–07 season, after impressing in a reserve team match. Blayney made his début for Oldham Athletic in a 1–2 home defeat against Bournemouth, after first choice goalkeeper Les Pogliacomi was suspended.

League of Ireland & Irish League 
On 7 August, Alan Blayney joined Irish side Bohemians on a short term deal to provide cover for first choice goalkeeper Brian Murphy. He marked his debut with a clean sheet as Bohs beat Bray Wanderers 3–0 on 31 August. He failed to gain the number 1 shirt from Brian Murphy though and was released at the end of the season.

On 15 March 2008, Blayney signed for Irish Premiership side  Ballymena United, although he was unable to play for the Braidmen until the 2008–09 season. In June 2009, Blayney signed a three-year contract for Linfield. Following good performances for Linfield on their way to the 2010–11 IFA Premiership title, Blayney was chosen as the Ulster Footballer of the Year for the 2010–11 season.
He joined fellow NIFL Premiership club Ards on loan for the second half of the 2013–14 season.

Following his loan spell at Ards, Blayney left Linfield at the end of the 2013–14 NIFL Premiership season to sign for 2013–14 Irish Cup winners Glenavon. Despite a strong start to the season, Blayney later lost his starting spot at Glenavon to number two goalkeeper James McGrath, and left the club for a second spell at Ballymena United on 5 May 2015.

Blayney initially started his second spell at Ballymena as the number one choice, following the departure of Australian goalkeeper Tim Allen. However, the arrival of former Linfield manager David Jeffrey saw his game time limited, with Linfield loanee Ross Glendinning usurping Blayney as number one during the 2016–17 season. The return of Tim Allen to the club meant that Blayney was free to talk to other clubs. He left Ballymena by mutual consent on 27 January 2017.

Blayney signed for NIFL Premier Intermediate League side Dundela on 1 February 2017. He returned to the NIFL Premiership in the 2017-18 season, having signed a pre-contract with 2016–17 NIFL Championship winners Warrenpoint Town.

On 14 December 2017, it was announced that Blayney had signed for Ballyclare Comrades.

International football
Blayney, a former Northern Ireland under-21 international, played his first match for the Northern Ireland senior national team in their 2006 summer tour of the United States. Northern Ireland lost the match against Romania 2–0. He followed this with three appearances in 2010.

Honours
Linfield
IFA Premiership: 2009–10, 2010–11, 2011–12
Irish Cup: 2009–10, 2010–11, 2011–12

References

External links

Northern Ireland international career details

1981 births
Living people
Association footballers from Belfast
Association footballers from Northern Ireland
Association football goalkeepers
Premier League players
English Football League players
League of Ireland players
NIFL Premiership players
Ballymena United F.C. players
Bohemian F.C. players
AFC Bournemouth players
Brighton & Hove Albion F.C. players
Doncaster Rovers F.C. players
Linfield F.C. players
Oldham Athletic A.F.C. players
Rushden & Diamonds F.C. players
Southampton F.C. players
Stockport County F.C. players
Northern Ireland under-21 international footballers
Northern Ireland international footballers
Ulster Footballers of the Year
Warrenpoint Town F.C. players
Ballyclare Comrades F.C. players
Dundela F.C. players
Ards F.C. players
Glenavon F.C. players